Sidorov (masculine), Sidorova (feminine) or Sidorovo (neutral) may refer to:

Villages in Perm Krai, Russia
Bolshaya Sidorova, Kudymkarsky District
Malaya Sidorova, Kudymkarsky District
Sidorova (Leninskoye Rural Settlement), Kudymkarsky District, Perm Krai
Sidorova (Verkh-Invenskoye Rural Settlement), Kudymkarsky District, Perm Krai

Other uses
Sidorov (surname)
Sidorova Island, an island in the Kara Sea, Russia 
9005 Sidorova, an asteroid